TTC may refer to:

In arts and entertainment 
 Tao Te Ching, the collection of sayings attributed to Lao Tzu
 Tom Tom Club, an American new wave band
 The Travel Channel, a cable channel devoted to travel
 The Tennis Channel, a digital channel devoted to tennis
 TTC (band), a French hip-hop trio

Businesses and organizations 
 Toronto Transit Commission, a public transit operator in Toronto, Ontario, Canada
 The Teaching Company, an American company that produces recordings of lectures by university professors, the distributor of The Great Courses
 The Tetris Company, owner of the trademark and copyright for Tetris
 Telecommunication Technology Committee, a telecommunications standards body in Japan
Trade and Technology Council, a diplomatic forum for EU-US trade and tech
 Transmission Technologies Corporation, former name of automobile transmissions manufacturer TREMEC Corporation

Schools 
 Tatung Institute of Commerce and Technology, a college in Chiayi City, Taiwan
 Tendring Technology College, a secondary school in Essex, England
 Trident Technical College, a two-year public college in greater Charleston, South Carolina
 Tulsa Technology Center, a public college in Tulsa, Oklahoma
 TTC Yangon (Teacher's Training College), a combined primary & secondary school in Yangon, Myanmar, under Practising School Yangon Institute of Education
 Texas Technological College, former name of Texas Tech University
 , a middle school in Tuen Mun, Hong Kong

Places
 Transbay Transit Center, an intermodal transit station in San Francisco
 Trenton Transit Center, a train station in Trenton, New Jersey
 Transportation and Ticket Center, a transport hub at the Walt Disney World Resort
 Trans-Texas Corridor, an American transportation network of expressways, rails, and utility lines being constructed in Texas
 Trans Thane Creek, a creek running between Thane and Navi Mumbai, India
 Telford Town Centre, an area of central Telford, England, officially known Telford Shopping Centre
 Transportation Technology Center, a federal rail testing facility in Pueblo, Colorado

In science and technology
 Tetrazolium chloride, a redox indicator commonly used in biochemical experiments especially to indicate cellular respiration
 TrueType Collection, a file type that packs several TrueType fonts into a single file
 Top trading cycle, an algorithm for trading or optimal matching indivisible items without using money
 General time- and transfer constant analysis in electronic circuits
 Toyota TTC (Toyota Total Clean system), an emission control technology used by Toyota during the 1970s
 Tracking, telemetry, and control, a subsystem of spacecraft and ground segments which handles communications
 Threshold of Toxicological Concern, in toxicology
TTC, a codon for the amino acid Phenylalanine
 Cugir Tokarov, a Romanian variant of the Soviet TT-33 pistol